The Shorter Cemetery is an American Civil War-era cemetery in Eufaula, Barbour County, Alabama, United States. It is where Governor John Gill Shorter, his family (including his father, the General Reuben Clark Shorter), and his family's slaves are buried. 

In 2010, the cemetery was listed as one of Alabama's most endangered sites by the Alabama Historical Commission and Alabama Trust for Historic Preservation due to vandalism and natural deterioration of the tombstones, statues, walls, and fencing.

See also
 Shorter Mansion
 List of Civil War Discovery Trail sites
 Places in Peril (Alabama)

References

External links
 
 

Historic sites in Alabama
Cemeteries in Alabama
American Civil War cemeteries